Route 90 may refer to:

Dublin Bus (No. 90)
London Buses route 90

See also
List of highways numbered 90

90